van Damm or Van Damm is a surname of Dutch origin. Notable people with the name include:

Vivian Van Damm (1895–1960), British London theatre impresario
Sheila van Damm (1922–1987), British motor rally competitor and theatre owner; daughter of Vivian van Damm

See also
 van Damme (disambiguation)
 van Dam
 Dam, Danish surname

Surnames of Dutch origin